Frowein is a surname of German origin.

List of people with the surname 

 Anna-Elisabeth von Treuenfels-Frowein (born 1962), German politician
 Eberhard Frowein (1881–1964), German screenwriter and film director

See also 

 Frowin

Surnames
Surnames of German origin
German-language surnames